Kilwa Thermal Power Station, is a planned 318 megawatts, liquefied natural gas-fired thermal power station in Tanzania.

Location

Overview
The power station would be owned and operated by Tanzania National Electricity Supply Company, the national parastatal electricity generator, transmitter and distributor. The new power plant is expected to add 318 megawatts to the national generating capacity of 1500 megawatts, as of July 2018.

Financing
As of July 2018, the Trade and Development Bank has committed to lend US$200 towards the construction of this power station. In the same month, Credit Suisse, the Swiss multinational investment bank, committed US$200 in credit to Tanzania towards energy and transportation infrastructure projects, that include this power station.

See also

Tanzania Power Stations
Africa Power Stations
World Power Stations

References

External links
Tanzania Set to Increase Use of Natural Gas to Generate Electricity
Mega gas plant in Tanzania to be constructed

Lindi Region
Power stations in Tanzania
Natural gas-fired power stations in Tanzania
Energy infrastructure in Tanzania